Renaudin is a French surname. Notable people with the surname include:

Cyprien Renaudin (1757–1836), French navy officer
Jean François Renaudin (1750–1809), French Navy admiral
Léopold Renaudin (1749–1795), French revolutionary

See also
French destroyer Renaudin

French-language surnames